José Folgado Blanco (3 April 1944 – 23 March 2020) was a Spanish businessman, economist and politician.

Biography
He was a member of the People's Party. He served as president of Red Eléctrica de España from 2012 to 2018; as Deputy of Congress in 2000 and from 2004 to 2008, representing Zamora; as mayor of Tres Cantos from 2007 to 2012.

Folgado also was Secretary of State for Budgets and Expenses between 1996 and 2000; for Economy, Energy and SMEs between 2000 and 2002; and for Energy, Industrial Development and SMEs since 2002 until 2004.

He died on 23 March 2020 of COVID-19 at the age of 75.

Honors
  Order of Isabella the Catholic (Knight Grand Cross. 2004)

References

1944 births
2020 deaths
Members of the 7th Congress of Deputies (Spain)
Members of the 8th Congress of Deputies (Spain)
Spanish economists
Politicians from Castile and León
20th-century Spanish politicians
21st-century Spanish politicians
People's Party (Spain) politicians
Academic staff of the Autonomous University of Madrid
Autonomous University of Madrid alumni
People from the Province of Zamora
Knights Grand Cross of the Order of Isabella the Catholic
Spanish business executives
Deaths from the COVID-19 pandemic in Spain
Mayors of places in the Community of Madrid
Secretaries of State of Spain